Richard Pelletier (born November 22, 1951) is a former American football player and coach. He served as the head football coach at Gallaudet University in Washington, D.C. from 1989 to 1992, compiling a record of 9–27–1.

References

1951 births
Living people
American football defensive backs
American football punters
Gallaudet Bison football coaches
Holy Cross Crusaders football players